Samuel Hopkins (April 9, 1753 – September 16, 1819) was a U.S. Representative from Kentucky.

Born in Albemarle County in the Virginia Colony, Hopkins was educated by private tutors.  He served in the Revolutionary War, for a while on the staff of General Washington, and later as lieutenant colonel and colonel of the Tenth Virginia Regiment.  He was an original member of the Virginia Society of the Cincinnati.

In 1796, Hopkins moved to Kentucky and settled on the Ohio River in 1797 at a point then called Red Banks, now called Henderson, Kentucky.
He studied law and was admitted to the bar.  Hopkins was appointed chief justice of the first court of criminal common law and chancery jurisdiction in 1799, and served until his resignation in 1801.  Hopkins served as a member of the State house of representatives in 1800, 1801, and 1803–1806.  He later served in the Kentucky State Senate from 1809 to 1813.

In 1812, Hopkins was appointed Commander in Chief of the western frontier (Illinois and Indiana Territory), with the rank of Major General.  He participated in the Peoria War and was commander at Spur's Defeat; after these series of losses, he resigned from active duty.

Hopkins was elected as a Democratic-Republican to the Thirteenth Congress (March 4, 1813 – March 3, 1815).  He was not a candidate for renomination in 1814.
Samuel Hopkins retired to his country estate, Spring Garden, near Henderson, Kentucky, and died there September 16, 1819.  He was interred in the family burying ground at Spring Garden.

Hopkinsville, Kentucky was named for him by the Kentucky Assembly in 1804, as was Hopkins County, Kentucky two years later.

References

1753 births
1819 deaths
Members of the Kentucky House of Representatives
Kentucky state senators
Continental Army officers from Virginia
United States Army personnel of the War of 1812
Kentucky lawyers
People from Kentucky in the War of 1812
People from Albemarle County, Virginia
Democratic-Republican Party members of the United States House of Representatives from Kentucky
United States Army generals
19th-century American lawyers